Keith Watson (Ormesby, 1 February 1935 – Cheam, 9 April 1994) was a British comics artist most famous for his work on Dan Dare and TV Century 21.

Career
Watson joined the studio team of Frank Hampson working on the Dan Dare strip in Eagle in 1958. After Hampson left the strip the following year, Watson worked on Captain Condor for the rival comic Lion. He later returned to Dan Dare, becoming the sole artist.

Watson worked on the Captain Scarlet and the Mysterons strip in TV Century 21, and the Joe 90 strip in the comic of the same name, and later in the merged "TV21 and Joe 90". He also wrote some of the later episode.

During the 1970s, he worked for Dutch comics (Roel Dijkstra)

In 1989, he revived the original Dare for the new Eagle comic, which until then had been publishing tales of a descendant.

He died from cancer aged 59.

External links
 Obituary from The Independent, 19 April 1994
 The Gerry Anderson Complete Comic Archive including examples of Watson's work on Captain Scarlet
 Biography at lambiek.net

1935 births
1994 deaths
British comics artists